Fourchette can refer to:
 :fr:Fourchette, the French word for fork
 In English, a technical term for
a type of dessert fork
a component of a glove
 In female human anatomy, the frenulum labiorum pudendi
 Fourchette piercing